Fort Ridgely was a frontier United States Army outpost from 1851 to 1867, built 1853–1854 in Minnesota Territory.  The Sioux called it Esa Tonka.  It was located overlooking the Minnesota river southwest of Fairfax, Minnesota.  Half of the fort's land was part of the south reservation in the Minnesota river valley for the Mdewakanton and Wahpekute tribes. Fort Ridgely had no defensive wall, palisade, or guard towers.   The Army referred to the fort as the "New Post on the Upper Minnesota" until it was named for three Maryland Army Officers named Ridgely (Thomas, Randolph and Lott Henderson), who died during the Mexican–American War.

History

Construction
The War Department hired Mr. Jessie H. Pomeroy of St. Paul to build both Fort Ridgely and Fort Ripley. At Ridgely there were two Companies of troops that assisted in quarrying the granite two miles away, transporting it to the site, and the erection of a 400-man stone barracks.  The barracks formed the east side of the 90 square yard parade ground of the wall-less fort.

In 1854–55, Congress approved $10,000 for the clearing of timber on a military road from St Anthony Falls to Fort Ridgely. On July 22, 1856, Congress approved another $50,000 to build a wagon road from Fort Ridgely to South Pass, Nebraska Territory.  William H. Nobles was appointed superintendent of the road's construction. He encountered problems receiving disbursements to cover the basic labor costs incurred.

March 8, 1857, the Spirit Lake Massacre took place across the border in Iowa.  Fort Ridgely sent troops commanded by Captain Bee to investigate.  They found that Inkpaduta and his band had departed, but Lt. Murray and 25 men were left to search while Capt. Bee and the others returned to Fort Ridgely.  The sole survivor was a 14 year old named Abbie Gardner who was made a prisoner for four months.  On March 26 the band made a raid on Springfield, Minnesota and according to Abbie, Lt. Murray and his men came into sight two days later,  unaware how close they came to encountering the band.   Two Wahpeton bargained for the Government for her release and took her to the Upper Sioux Agency.  From there she was moved to the Fort Ridgely where she was put on a riverboat to St Paul.

Sioux Uprising
The fort played an important role in the Dakota War of 1862.  It would go into American West history as the only fort to come under attack as it experienced.  On August 18 Captain Marsh, the fort commander, took most of the garrison to the Lower Sioux Agency upon receiving reports that the Agency had been attacked. Second Lt. Gere and a few men were on duty there.  Marsh and his men came under attack when they stopped for water. That action became known as the Battle of Redwood Ferry. Earlier in August Capt. Marsh had requested assistance from C Company at Fort Ripley to oversee the annuity and provisions exchange at the Upper Sioux Agency.   Fort Ripley's executive officer, 1st Lt. Sheehan brought two Mountain Howitzers and 40 men to do the job.  Initially, Indian Agent Thomas Galbraith refused to extend credit to the Sissiton and Whapeton.  However, after a heated exchange Lt. Sheehan with his howitzers convinced all parties that an orderly distribution of food was best. With that done and thinking their task was completed, C Company departed for their own post the morning that the lower Agency was over-run.  Unbeknownst to Sheehan, Galbraith had refused to extend credit to the Mdewakanton and Wahpekute at the Lower Sioux Agency.  B Company didn't have the same military force presence at the Lower Sioux Agency and the situation there spiraled out of control.

When Capt. Marsh learned of the outbreak he sent a runner to catch up with C company for their support. Lt. Sheehan and his men were near Glencoe, Minnesota, about 40 miles distance, when they were caught up with.  Sheehan marched his men through the night making it back to Ridgely by noon that day.  Their reinforcement of the garrison changed the Fort's defense as it had more fire power than it could use with eight artillery pieces.  When 2nd Lt. Gere learned of Capt. March's death he sent a Private William Sturgis to inform Fort Snelling.  Sturgis rode through the night covering the 125 miles in eighteen hours. The Sioux attacked Ridgely's combined military/civilian force twice, on August 20 and August 22.  B and C Companies of the 5th Minnesota together militia and settlers of the Minnesota River valley totaling 230 opposed by 800 Mdewakanton and Wahpekute led by Little Crow. Some of the civilians were native Métis members of the Renville Rangers militia that had been in the process of departing for Fort Snelling to enlist in a Minnesota Volunteer Infantry unit. Private Sturgis gave them the word they were needed at Fort Ridgely.  Fort artillery is credited with repulsing the overwhelming force.  Ordinance Sergeant John Jones was the sole regular Army at the fort. He is credited with Ridgely's successful defense by organizing men with artillery experience to man three cannon,  two 12-pounders and the 24-pounder.  With all the caissons available, while one was servicing a gun position another was restocked and readied to immediately replace it when it was depleted.  This allowed the guns to be fired non-stop when needed.  C Company remained at the fort until after Col. Sibley arrived with the 6th Minnesota, Companies A, B, F, G 7th Minnesota,Company A 9th Minnesota and Companies G & I 10th Minnesota.  With dead laying all over the frontier, Sibley dispatched 170 men as burial parties. Two of those burial parties met and bivouacked 16 miles from Fort Ridgely. On Sept 2nd they were ambushed in the Battle of Birch Coulee.  Lt. Sheehan and his men were part of the relief force. Afterwards Sibley ordered them back to Fort Ripley to get their garrison back to strength with the frontier in turmoil.

On 4 September the 3rd Minnesota arrived back at Fort Snelling and joined Sibley at Fort Ridgely on the 12th.

As the war against the Sioux expanded, three Companies of the 30th Wisconsin Infantry Regiment later transitioned Fort Ridgely and New Ulm en route to Fort Wadsworth (Sisseton).  For a period a battery of the 3rd Minnesota light Artillery was posted to the fort. Sergeant Jones resigned from the U.S. Army for a Captain's commission in the 3rd Minn. Artillery.  Postwar Capt. Jones served one term as the Chief of police in St. Paul.

Notable Officers posted to Fort Ridgely
Notable officers posted to Fort Ridgely included:
Major Samuel Woods (6th U.S. Infantry), first post commander 1852–53, would become a Lt. Colonel and paymaster of the Department of Dakota.
Major George W. Patten, post commander twice, 1856 and 1861. Lost a hand at the Battle of Cerro Gordo, Mexico and became a Lt. Colonel.
Lt. Alfred Sulley 1855 made Major General by end of Indian Wars.
Lt. John C. Kelton (6th U.S. Infantry) 1852 would become the Adjunct General United States Army
Lt. Winfield Scott Hancock 1853 would become a Major General and commander of the Department of Dakota 
Lt. Henry E. Maynadier (10th U.S. Infantry) 1856–57, became a  brevet Major General 
Lt. Frederick Steele 1854, became a Major General
Capt. John J. Abercrombie 1854, also served at Fort Ripley and established Fort Abercrombie. Became a Brigadier General. 
Colonel Edmund Brooke Alexander, post commander, 10th U.S. Infantry 1857 would become a brevet Brigadier General 
Major Thomas W. Sherman (3rd U.S. Artillery) at post when the post was made the Artillery School for Practice Fort Ridgely.  He was there 1858–1861 except while commander of an expedition to Kettle Lake in Dakota Territory in 1859.  He would become a brevet Major General
Major William W. Morris (4th U.S. Artillery) at post 1861 became a brevet Major General  
Capt. John S. Marsh replaced Major Morris and was killed in action at Redwood ferry 1862, (B Co. 5th Minnesota Infantry)
2nd Lt. Thomas P. Gere (B Co. 5th Minnesota) assumed command when Capt. Marsh was killed.  He received the Medal of Honor at the Battle of Nashville
1st Lt. Timothy J. Sheehan assumed post command from 2nd Lt. Gere 1862 (C Co. 5th Minnesota Infantry) wounded twice defending the post, made Lt. Colonel by end of Civil War, wounded 2 twice more 
 Major John Parker post commander, 1st Minnesota Mounted Rangers
 Major E.A.Hatch, was at the Battle of Fort Ridgely as a civilian hired by the  Northern Superintendency of Indian Affairs to accompany the annuity payment from St Paul.  He would be enlisted as a Major in 1863 and made commander of the 1st Minnesota Indian Volunteer Regiment better known as Hatch's Battalion.
Capt. Bernard Bee became Brigadier General CSA and is credited with giving Stonewall Jackson his nickname at the First Battle of Bullrun, where he was killed in action.
Major J.C. Pemberton post commander 1859–61 became a CSA Lt. General and would surrender to Ulysses Grant at Vicksburg.
Lt. Lewis A. Armistead post commander (6th Infantry), became a CSA Lt. General
Corporal Daniel W. Burke(Companies B & E 2nd U.S. Infantry) 1858–59 would become Brigadier General. He received the Medal of Honor during the Civil War at the Battle of Shepherdstown.
 Capt. James L. Fisk (3rd Minnesota Infantry special assignment Quartermaster Corps) 1863,64.

Units assigned to the outpost
In its time, numerous units were assigned to the outpost. From the U.S. Army: Companies of the 2nd, 6th, and 10th Infantry Regiments as well as batteries of the 2nd, 3rd, 4th Artillery Regiments, as well as I Co. 1st U.S. Volunteer Regiment.

Until 1859 the garrison was typically three companies of infantry of 30-40 men each. That year the Army designated the fort as an Artillery School for Practice and supplied six pieces of various calibers: two M1841 6-pounder field guns, 12-pounder, M1841 mountain howitzer, 12 pound Napoleon, and M1841 24-pounder howitzer.

From 1857 to 1861, Companies G, I, L 2nd Artillery were variously posted to northern forts: Snelling, Ridgely, and Ripley.  In 1859, Companies F and K of the 4th Artillery were posted to the Fort.  May 1861 saw E Company 3rd Artillery withdrawn to the east because of the rebellion.

During the civil war Companies from Minnesota Volunteer Regiments served in place of the regular army.  These included the 1st, 2nd, 4th, 5th, 6th, 8th, 9th, and 10th regiments, 2nd Cavalry, 1st Mounted Rangers, Brackett's Cavalry and a battery from the 3rd light artillery.

1864 wagon train
On July 15, 1864, Capt. James L. Fisk of the Quartermaster Corps lead 97 wagons of pioneers out of Fort Ridgely to meet Gen. Sulley at Fort Rice for escort to the gold fields in Montana Territory.  Gen.Sulley departed early, so Fort Rice provided a 40-man escort.  On September 2, one hundred eighty miles west, the train ran into Sitting bull's warriors.  The wagon train made a 300' diameter defense of sod that was named Fort Dilts.  General Sully organized a rescue expedition consisting of 300 men 30th Wisconsin, 200 8th Minnesota, 100 7th Iowa Cavalry(dismounted) and 100 each from the 2nd Minnesota Cavalry, Brackett's Battalion and the 6th Iowa Cavalry.  The Minnesota units rendezvous at Fort Ridgely to head west and rescued the outpost on the 20th.  However, a wagon of poisoned food was left by Minnesotans that had lost family in the 1862 uprising.  Upon reaching Fort Rice the wagon expedition disbanded.

Abandonment of the post
In June 1865 the 10th Infantry returned to Fort Snelling and Companies B and H were posted to Fort Ridgely.
The Army abandoned Fort Ridgely in 1867 and posted the garrison to Fort Wadsworth (Sisseton). Civilians occupied the vacant buildings and later dismantled them for the building materials. In 1863 one of the 6-pounders from the fort was given to the New Ulm Battery by General Sibley.

State Recognition

In 1895 the Minnesota legislature authorized $3,000, roughly $102,000.00 in 2020 dollars, for the construction of a monument to the Minnesota citizens who had defended the fort.  On 20 August 1896 the granite structure was dedicated with many of the surviving defenders attending.  Werner Boesch, the ex-Swiss artilleryman that had helped man a 12-pounder during the attacks, had a Fort Ridgely Defender Medal made for the occasion. On it he quoted Big Eagle's comment about the Fort: "Ti-Yo-Pa  Na-Ta-Ka-Pi" or they "Kept the Door Shut" to the lower Minnesota river valley.  The reverse reads: Presented by the State of Minnesota.

The State erected another large monument to the Chief Mou-zoo-mau-nee and the Mille Lacs Band of Ojibwe in 1914.  Chief Mou-zoo-mau-nee sent 300 warriors to the Fort Ripley to augment in its defense during the uprising.   The State held a large dedication and the Milles Lacs band sent a delegation to represent the band.

Site of the fort today

Today the building foundations have been exposed by State archeologists. The Minnesota Historical Society maintains the publicly owned portion within Fort Ridgely State Park. The old commissary building (partially reconstructed by the Civilian Conservation Corps in the 1930s) now houses the Park's museum. Fort Ridgely was added to the National Register of Historic Places in 1970, with much of the park added in 1989.

See also 
Lower Sioux Agency
Battle of Redwood Ferry
Battle of Birch Coulee
Battles of New Ulm
Battle of Wood Lake
Slaughter Slough
Surrender at Camp Release

References

Further reading
Barnes, Jeff. Forts of the Northern Plains: Guide to Historic Military Posts of the Plains Indian Wars. Mechanicsburg, PA: Stackpole Books, 2008.

External links

Fort Ridgely State Park from the Minnesota Department of Natural Resources
Minnesota Historical Society: Fort Ridgely
Nicollet County Historical Society
 Fort Ridgely watercolor by Lt. Sulley 1855, at the Gilcrease Museum, Tulsa, Oklahoma

Dakota War of 1862
Ridgely
Military and war museums in Minnesota
Military sites of the wars between the United States and Native Americans
Minnesota in the American Civil War
Minnesota state historic sites
Museums in Nicollet County, Minnesota
Minnesota Historical Society
Ridgely
1853 establishments in Minnesota Territory
Historic districts on the National Register of Historic Places in Minnesota
National Register of Historic Places in Nicollet County, Minnesota
Native American history of Minnesota